Perungudi is a railway station on the Chennai MRTS. It serves the neighbourhood of Perungudi, including localities such as Indira Nagar, Park Avenue and Tansi Nagar. It is located 1.3 km from the Perungudi Lake.

History
Perungudi station was opened on 19 November 2007, as part of the second phase of the Chennai MRTS network.

Structure
The length of the platform is 280 m. The station premises includes 8,080 sq m of open parking area.

A two-wheeler parking lot was created at the station in 2011, where about 150 to 200 two-wheelers and bicycles are parked every day.

Service and connections

Perungudi station is the sixteenth station on the MRTS line to Velachery. In the return direction from Velachery, it is currently the second station towards Chennai Beach station A 3.4 km-long, 18 m-wide access road to Perungudi station and Taramani station is being constructed along the MRTS line from Velachery to Taramani.

See also
 Chennai MRTS
 Chennai suburban railway
 Chennai Metro
 Transport in Chennai

References

Chennai Mass Rapid Transit System stations
Railway stations in Chennai
Railway stations opened in 2007